Doug is a masculine given name.

Doug may also refer to:

 Doug (TV series), an American animated series and sitcom
 Doug E. Doug, American actor born Douglas Bourne (born 1970) 
 Doug (tuber)
 Doug flag, also called "the Doug", an unofficial flag of the Cascadia bioregion of western North America
 Dig Dug, the eponymous protagonist of the Dig Dug series of video games
 93.1 Doug FM, a former brand of WDRQ, a radio station licensed to Detroit, Michigan